Giant (stylized as GIANT) was a men's magazine based in New York City geared to the urban music market. It began in October 2004 as a bimonthly publication catering to the interests of 20-something men, focusing on pop culture including reviews of video games, movies, fine tobacco, music, everyday happenings and celebrity interviews.

In August 2006, the magazine had a makeover under new editor-in-chief Smokey Fontaine, formerly of the hip hop magazine America. Under his leadership, the magazine began to focus on music, lifestyle, and entertainment for the urban reader.  Later, Emil Wilbekin served as the standing Editor-In-Chief.

Covers included Beyoncé, Pharrell, Diddy, The Killers, Ciara, Jennifer Hudson, Janet Jackson, and Eve. The June/July issue offered two covers; one of R&B artist Robin Thicke and one of Rihanna. Chris Brown and Prince have also appeared on the cover. Along with the magazine, Giants website serves as a blog for readers to get additional information on artists that have been featured in the magazine, as well as contests and giveaways.

Radio One, the radio empire started by Cathy Hughes and now presided over by her son, Alfred Liggins, purchased the magazine in January 2007 for a reported $270,000. Giant was Radio One's first foray into the print media market. The magazine was closed in December 2009.

References

External links
 

Bimonthly magazines published in the United States
Men's magazines published in the United States
Defunct magazines published in the United States
Entertainment magazines published in the United States
Magazines disestablished in 2009
Magazines established in 2004
Urban One